Jérémie Roumegous Geremia (born May 9, 1985 in Villefranche-de-Rouergue) is a French football defender who last played for French club Rodez AF.

Career 
On 15 June 2009 LB Châteauroux have signed the defender from Championnat National side Nîmes Olympique. His previous clubs include AJ Auxerre, Rodez AF and J.S.P. Montbazens.

References

External links 
 Foot-National Profile
 

People from Villefranche-de-Rouergue
1985 births
Living people
French footballers
AJ Auxerre players
Nîmes Olympique players
Rodez AF players
Association football defenders
Sportspeople from Aveyron
Footballers from Occitania (administrative region)